The Tutaekuri River, in the Wairoa District of New Zealand's Hawke's Bay, rises below Gaddum Road, in the Tutaekuri Conservation Area and flows about  east before joining the Waiau River near Raumotu Bridge, about  from its confluence with the Wairoa River at Frasertown.

In the upper part of the river, tawa is the dominant canopy tree, with tītoki, hīnau, nīkau, pukatea, ngaio, kōwhai and scattered mataī, miro and rewarewa.

References 

Rivers of the Hawke's Bay Region
Rivers of New Zealand